Thackrey is a surname. Notable people with the surname include:

Sean Thackrey (1942–2022), American winemaker
Ted Thackrey (1901–1980), American journalist and publisher
Tim Thackrey (born 1979), American taekwondo athlete

See also
Thackeray (disambiguation)
Thackery (disambiguation)
Thackray, a surname